Snegamook Lake is a medium-sized lake in central Labrador (in the Canadian province of Newfoundland and Labrador).

The lake drained by the Kanairiktok River, over a small waterfall at the lake's eastern end, to the Atlantic via Kanairiktok Bay.

Located within the Central Mineral Belt (of Labrador) the area has been prospected for minerals since the 1920s, with a current focus on copper-gold and uranium deposits. The region is mostly uninhabited and access to Snegamook Lake is by floatplane or helicopter (out of Goose Bay, Labrador). Some manage to travel by canoe or dogsled.

The name is derived from the Innu-aimun Ashtunekamiku, meaning Canoe Building Shelter.

Labrador
Lakes of Newfoundland and Labrador